The 1963 Minnesota Twins finished 91–70, third in the American League. 1,406,652 fans attended Twins games, the highest total in the American League.

Offseason
 November 5, 1962: Rudy May was signed as an amateur free agent by the Twins.
 November 26, 1962: Rich Reese was drafted by the Twins from the Detroit Tigers in the 1962 first-year draft.
 November 26, 1962: Joe Foy was drafted by the Boston Red Sox from the Minnesota Twins in the 1962 minor league draft.
 January 21, 1963: Rubén Gómez was released by the Twins.

Regular season
Four Twins made the All-Star Game: first baseman Harmon Killebrew, shortstop Zoilo Versalles, outfielder Bob Allison and catcher Earl Battey.

On August 29, the Twins played two games at Washington.  The club struck for eight home runs in the first game (to tie an American League record) and four more in the nightcap, for an even dozen on the day.

On September 21, the Twins played two games at Boston's Fenway Park.  Slugger Harmon Killebrew connected for three home runs in the first game and another in the nightcap.  His four-homer double-header tied an AL record.

Harmon Killebrew again led the team (and the American League) with 45 home runs; his 96 RBI was Minnesota's best.  Bob Allison hit 35 home runs and drove in 91. Camilo Pascual won 21 games and led the AL with 202 strikeouts.

With 33 home runs, Twins rookie Jimmie Hall topped the Boston Red Sox Ted Williams' "true rookie" American League record of 31 homers, set by Williams in 1939.  The team's total of 225 home runs was the second-most ever in a season, only trailing the 1961 New York Yankees' 240.

Three Twins won Gold Gloves: first baseman Vic Power won his sixth, shortstop Zoilo Versalles won his first, and Jim Kaat won his second.

Season standings

Record vs. opponents

Notable transactions
 May 21, 1963: Bill Tuttle was released by the Twins.
 August 24, 1963: Dwight Siebler was purchased by the Twins from the Philadelphia Phillies.

Roster

Player stats

Batting

Starters by position
Note: Pos = Position; G = Games played; AB = At bats; H = Hits; Avg. = Batting average; HR = Home runs; RBI = Runs batted in

Other batters
Note: G = Games played; AB = At bats; H = Hits; Avg. = Batting average; HR = Home runs; RBI = Runs batted in

Pitching

Starting pitchers
Note: G = Games pitched; IP = Innings pitched; W = Wins; L = Losses; ERA = Earned run average; SO = Strikeouts

Other pitchers
Note: G = Games pitched; IP = Innings pitched; W = Wins; L = Losses; ERA = Earned run average; SO = Strikeouts

Relief pitchers
Note: G = Games pitched; W = Wins; L = Losses; SV = Saves; ERA = Earned run average; SO = Strikeouts

Farm system

LEAGUE CHAMPIONS: Wilson

Notes

References
Player stats from www.baseball-reference.com
Team info from www.baseball-almanac.com

Minnesota Twins seasons
Minnesota Twins season
Minnesota Twins